Xanthoparmelia idahoensis is a lichen which belongs to the Xanthoparmelia genus. The lichen is uncommon and is listed as endangered by the Nature Conservatory.

Description 
Grows in bunches and found on soil it's lobes are firm but can break apart when collected. Samples collected have been 2–4 cm in diameter with broad yellowish green lobes which are approximately 1.5-4 mm wide and are contorted or twisted. Very spare simple rhizines on the underside that are 0.2-0.3mm long.

Habitat and range 
Found in the North American southwest including the US states of Idaho, Colorado, and Wyoming and the Canadian province of Saskatchewan.

See also 

 List of Xanthoparmelia species

References 

idahoensis
Lichen species
Lichens of North America